Sirsha may refer to:

Sirsha, India
Sirsha, Nepal